A mirror TV or TV mirror is a television that can change into a mirror. Mirror TVs are often used to save space or hide electronics in bathrooms, bedrooms and living rooms. Mirror TVs can be integrated into interior designs, including in smart homes, hotels, offices, gyms, and spas.

A mirror TV consists of special semi-transparent mirror glass with an LCD TV behind the mirrored surface. The mirror is carefully polarized to allow an image to transfer through the mirror, such that when the TV is off, the device looks like a mirror.

Placement of a mirror TV is important to ensure both good mirror reflection and television picture quality. A space with high levels of lighting is optimal for reflection when the TV looks like a mirror, while low levels of light is ideal for TV viewing. Experts recommend using block out blinds in bright rooms, such as those with large windows and skylights, when watching television on a TV-Mirror during the day to reduce the amount of reflection when the TV is on. TV viewing is not affected by reflection on the TV mirror in the evenings.

Some manufacturers offer high-end input and output options for entire-home A/V integration.

References

Television technology